The 2013 Big South Conference football season began on Thursday, August 29 and concluded in December with the 2014 NCAA Division I Football Championship. The regular season concluded on November 23, and Coastal Carolina won the conference's regular season championship and automatic bid to the playoffs. The Chanticleers defeated Bethune-Cookman in the first round and Montana in the second round before falling to eventual champion North Dakota State in the quarterfinals.

Preseason Poll Results
First place votes in parentheses

Preseason All-Conference Teams
Offensive Player of the Year: Lorenzo Taliaferro, Sr., RB (Coastal Carolina)
Defensive Player of the Year: Quinn Backus, Jr., LB (Coastal Carolina)

Regular season

All times Eastern time.

Week One

Week Two

Week Three

Week Four

Week Five

Week Six

Week Seven

Week Eight

Week Nine

Week Ten

Week Eleven

Week Twelve

Week Thirteen

2014 NFL Draft

Attendance

References